Belton High School is a 9–12 grade high school located in Belton, Missouri, United States. It is a part of Belton School District.

The district, and therefore the school boundary, includes most of Belton, Loch Lloyd, and Riverview Estates.

Notable alumni
Joe Falcon, middle-distance runner
John Kelsey, former WFL player
Brad St. Louis, former NFL player for the Cincinnati Bengals
Tate Stevens, The X Factor USA season 2 winner
Wayne Westerman, Founder of FingerWorks, which led to the iPhone touch technology

Notable faculty
Gregg Williams, former Buffalo Bills head coach, was the high school's football coach in the mid-1980s

References

External links

High schools in Cass County, Missouri
Public high schools in Missouri